Insurance is a means of protection from financial loss.

Insurance may also refer to:
 Insurance (constituency), a functional constituency in the Legislative Council of Hong Kong
 Insurance (football club), Ethiopian football club
 Insurance, a betting option in Blackjack
 Insurance Building (Olympia, Washington), a government building in Olympia, Washington

See also